United Future Organization (also known as UFO) is a nu-jazz trio made up of Japanese-born ,  and Frenchman .  In 1994, the group appeared on the Red Hot Organization's compilation album, Stolen Moments: Red Hot + Cool.  The album, meant to raise awareness and funds in support of the AIDS epidemic in relation to the African-American community, was heralded as "Album of the Year" by Time Magazine. One of the three original founding members, Toshio Matsuura, left the group in 2002 to work with Universal Japan on a remix album project.

Discography

Albums
 Jazzin '91 - '92' (1992)
 United Future Organization (1993)
 No Sound Is Too Taboo (1994)
 3rd Perspective (1997)
 Bon Voyage (1999)
 V(five) (2002)

Remix albums
 Remix (1995)
 Spicy Remix (1997)
 Bon Voyage Les Remix (2000)

Singles
 "I Love My Baby (My Baby Loves Jazz)" (1991)
 "Loud Minority" (1992)
 "Insomnie" (1992)
 "United Future Airlines" (1995)
 "Cosmic Gypcy" (1995)
 "Flying Saucer" (1999)
 "Somewhere/Labyrinth" (1999)
 "Good Luck Shore" (1999)
 "Tres Amigos" (1999)
 "Listen Love" (2002)
 "Transworld" (2002)

Compilations
 Upa Neguinho (Supa Neg Mix) – Multidirection (1993)
 Tres Amigos – This is Smooth Jazz, Vol. 3 (2001)
 Summertime (Remix) – Verve//Remixed (2002)
 Good Luck Shore (Joujouka TFPP Mix) – Mad Skipper Singles, Vol. 3 (2006)

Other
 Jazzin (1992)
 The Planet Plan
 Now & Then: Years Of Lightning, Day Of Drums 1990-1997 (1997)
 UFOs for Real Scene1 (2006)
 UFOs for Real Scene2 (2006)
 UFOs for Real Scene3 (2006)
 Rebirth of the Cool – A Deeper Shade of Blues (1992)

References

External links
 – official site

United Future Organization DJ schedule

Japanese jazz ensembles
Musical groups from Shibuya
Verve Forecast Records artists